Victor Löw (born 25 August 1962 in Amsterdam; originally Victor Löwenstein), is a Dutch actor.

Victor Löw studied at Studio Herman Teirlinck in Antwerp. He played his first small part in The Northerners. After that he played in numerous films, which include 3 Oscar nominated films (2 wins) Antonia's Line (1995), Character (1997) and Everybody Famous! (2000).

Filmography 
The Northerners (1992)
The three best things in life (1992)
Antonia's Line (1995)
Character (1997)
No trains no planes (1999) (TV film)
Do not disturb (1999)
Everybody Famous! (2000)
Lek (2000)
Costa! (2001)
The Enclave (2002) (TV film)
Supertex (2003)
Stille Nacht (2004)
For a few marbles more (2006) (voice)
Reykjavík-Rotterdam (2008)
Daylight (2013) 
Michiel de Ruyter (2015)

Awards and nominations 
 Nomination for a Golden Calf for Best Actor for his role in Meedingers (1998)
 Golden Calf for Best Actor for his role in Lek (2000)

References

External links 

1962 births
Dutch male film actors
Dutch male stage actors
Dutch male television actors
Living people
Male actors from Amsterdam
Golden Calf winners